Eupithecia maule is a moth of the family Geometridae. It is found in the regions of Antofagasta (Antofagasta Province) and Maule (Cauquenes Province) in Chile. The habitat consists of the Northern Coast and the Central Valley biotic provinces.

The length of the forewings is about 8 mm for both males and females. The forewings are greyish brown, slightly darker along part of the costa and distally, and with scattered reddish brown scales in the lower and outer portions of the wings. The hindwings are greyish white, with dark scaling along the anal margin and distally. Adults have been recorded on wing in October and January.

Etymology
The specific name is based on the type locality.

References

Moths described in 1987
maule
Moths of South America
Endemic fauna of Chile